The 2019 CONMEBOL South American Under-20 Beach Soccer Championship was the second edition of the South American Under-20 Beach Soccer Championship (known natively in Spanish as the Sudamericano Sub-20 Futbol Playa), an international youth beach soccer tournament for South American national teams of men under the age of 20. 

The championship was organised by CONMEBOL, the governing body for football in South America, in cooperation with the local organisers, the Paraguayan Football Association (APF). The event took place between 8 and 15 December in Luque, Gran Asuncion, Paraguay.

Brazil were the defending champions but lost to Argentina in the final who claimed their first title in what was a repeat of the final of the previous edition, but with the reverse outcome.

Teams
Under 20s teams representing nine of the 10 members of CONMEBOL took part.

Due to "force majeure", Venezuela were the only team not participating.

Venue

One venue was used in the city of Luque, Gran Asunción.
All matches took place at Los Pynandi World Cup Stadium, newly built to primarily host the 2019 FIFA Beach Soccer World Cup, located on the grounds of the Paraguayan Olympic Committee with a capacity of 2,820.

Squads
Each team must have submit a squad consisting of 12 players, of individuals no older than 20 years.

Draw
The draw to split the ten teams into two groups, one of five and one of four, took place on 19 November at 17:00 PYST (UTC–3) in Asunción, Paraguay at the headquarters of the APF.

Initially, two teams were automatically assigned to the groups:

to Group A: as the host association, 
to Group B: the champions of the previous edition, 

The remaining seven teams were split into four pots, three of two and one of one, shown in the below table.

The teams were seeded based on their final ranking in the previous edition of the South American Under-20 Beach Soccer Championship; the highest ranked teams were placed in Pot 1, next highest in Pot 2 and so on, down to the lowest ranked team placed in Pot 4. From each pot, one team was drawn into Group A and the other team was drawn into Group B. The single team in Pot 4 was drawn into one of the groups at random.

Group stage
The match schedule was announced on 27 November.

All times are local, PYST (UTC–3).

Group A

Group B

Placement matches
The teams finishing in third, fourth and fifth place in the groups are knocked out of title-winning contention; the four teams in the former two positions recede to play in consolatory placement matches to determine 5th through 8th place in the final standings.

Seventh place play-off

Fifth place play-off

Knockout stage
The group winners and runners-up progress to the knockout stage to continue to compete for the title.

Semi-finals

Third place play-off

Final

Awards
Immediately following the conclusion of the final, the following awards were presented.

Winners trophy

Individual awards

Final standings

References

External links
CONMEBOL, official website

 
Under-20 Beach Soccer Championship
2019 in beach soccer
South American Under-20 Beach Soccer
2019 in Paraguayan sport